Jean-Bernard Zuber is a French  theoretical physicist.

Biography
Zuber studied at the École polytechnique from 1966 to 1968 and then as a CNRS researcher at the theoretical physics department of the Nuclear Research Center in Saclay. In 1974, he received his doctorate from Jean Zinn-Justin at the University of Paris-Sud in Orsay. From 1975 to 2004 he was in the same capacity as an engineer of the French Alternative Energies and Atomic Energy Commission at Institute of Theoretical Physics (fr) in Saclay and at the same time (1995 through 1998) Professor at the Paris Diderot University.  From 1995 to 2000 he was the chairman of the CNRS section of theoretical physics. Since 2004 he has been a professor at the Pierre and Marie Curie University, (now Sorbonne Université),  Emeritus professor since 2014,  and between 2005  and 2013
he has been director of the Fédération de Recherches Interactions Fondamentales (FRIF).

Zuber is author of a standard work on quantum field theory (QFT) with Claude Itzykson, with whom he often collaborated. In addition to applications of QFT in elementary particle physics, it also deals with statistical mechanics, for example the Ising model, and in particular with conformal field theories, random matrices and matrix integrals including applications in combinatorics and knot theory.

Awards
In 1989 he received the Prix Dostaut-Blutet of the French Academy of Sciences and in 1991 the Prix Paul Langevin of the French Physical Society. Since 1999 he has been a Chevalier des Palmes Academiques.

Bibliography

Citations

Selected publications
with Claude Itzykson: Quantum Field Theory, McGraw Hill 1980, Dover 2005
Editor with Itzykson, Saleur: Conformal invariance and applications to statistical mechanics, World Scientific 1988
Editor with Raymond Stora : Recent Advances in Field Theory and Statistical Mechanics, Les Houches Summer School Volume 39, 1982, North Holland 1984
Editor with Jean-Michel Drouffe: The mathematical beauty of physics-a memorial volume for Claude Itzykson, World Scientific 1997
Editor with Cécile DeWitt-Morette : Quantum field theory- perspective and prospective (Les Houches 1998), Kluwer 1999
 Zuber J.-B., Thèse d'Etat, Université Paris XI, 28 janvier 1974, "Les champs de Yang-Mills et la diffusion des mésons pseudoscalaires"

External links 

 Homepage

Living people
Theoretical physicists
Mathematical physicists
École Polytechnique alumni
20th-century French physicists
Scientists from Paris
Members of the Académie Française
Members of the French Academy of Sciences
Quantum physicists
Year of birth missing (living people)